SAI Global is a multinational business services company based in Chicago, Illinois, United States. It offers risk management services, quality assurance audit and certification, auditor training, standards information services, and property services.

History 

In 2003 SAI Global was formed when Standards Australia sold off its commercial business. On December 17 that same year, SAI Global was floated on the Australian Stock Exchange with the initial shareholding of 40% retained by parent organization Standards Australia that was then progressively sold down to zero. In 2016, private equity firm Baring Private Equity Asia acquired SAI Global Group.

In May 2021, SAI sold its Global Standards and Assurance practice to Intertek Group for A$855 million.

References 

Financial services companies of the United States
Companies established in 2003